Mark John Morris (born 26 September 1962) is an English former professional footballer who played as a defender in the Football League for Wimbledon, where he was part of the so-called "Crazy Gang", Aldershot, Watford, Sheffield United, AFC Bournemouth, Gillingham and Brighton & Hove Albion. He then moved into non-league football with Hastings Town, leaving when the club had financial difficulties, and then Dorchester Town, where he spent several years as player, player-manager and manager, resigning when there was no money to renew players' contracts. He also ran a pub. Morris is now a coach at local Wessex League side New Milton Town.

References

External links
 
 League stats at Neil Brown's site

1962 births
Living people
Footballers from Carshalton
English footballers
Association football defenders
Wimbledon F.C. players
Aldershot F.C. players
Watford F.C. players
Sheffield United F.C. players
AFC Bournemouth players
Gillingham F.C. players
Brighton & Hove Albion F.C. players
Hastings United F.C. players
Dorchester Town F.C. players
English Football League players
English football managers
Dorchester Town F.C. managers